Laura Ricciardi (1969/1970) is an American filmmaker, producer and editor. Ricciardi is known for the documentary television series Making a Murderer, which she co-directed with filmmaker Moira Demos, in a process that took 10 years to complete. For her work on Making a Murderer, Ricciardi is the recipient of three Primetime Emmy Awards.

Education
Ricciardi graduated from Manhattan College in 1992 with a B.A. degree in English and government.

She then earned a Juris Doctor from New York Law School in February 1996 and an MFA in film from Columbia University School of the Arts. Her thesis film was recommended for a National Board of Review student award. In 2007, she received a filmmaking grant from The Peter S. Reed Foundation.

Career 


Prior to working in film, Ricciardi worked as a lawyer. In 2002, she worked as a production assistant on two episodes of In the Life, an LGBT newsmagazine produced by PBS.

Ricciardi and Moira Demos met while graduate students in Columbia University's film program in 2005. The two learned about Steven Avery, a convict in Wisconsin released due to DNA evidence, only to be accused of another crime, after reading an article in the New York Times. Both thought the case could make for an interesting documentary. Before meeting with Netflix, the company that ultimately chose to produce the series, Demos and Ricciardi met with executives at PBS and HBO, but neither network was interested in the project.

The series premiered in December 2015 to positive reviews. Review aggregator site Metacritic awarded it a score of 85 out of 100, indicating mostly positive reviews.

Ricciardi went on to win three Emmys for her work on Making a Murderer: Outstanding Documentary or Nonfiction Series, Outstanding Directing For Nonfiction Programming, and Outstanding Writing for Nonfiction Programming all three of which she shared with Moira Demos.

In 2018 Demos and Ricciardi released a second season of Making a Murderer.

Personal life
Ricciardi is in a long-term relationship with director Moira Demos.

References

Year of birth missing (living people)
Living people
Manhattan College alumni
New York Law School alumni
Columbia University School of the Arts alumni
American documentary film directors
American television directors
LGBT film directors
LGBT television directors
American women documentary filmmakers
21st-century American women
American women television directors